Kibiya is a Local Government Area in Kano State, Nigeria. Its headquarters are in the town of Kibiya. The traditional ruler of Kibiya is former Comptroller General of Immigration Senator Usman Kibiya Umar.

It has an area of 404 km and a population of 189,870 at the 2006 census.

The postal code of the area is 710.

References

Local Government Areas in Kano State